The 2006–07 season was Motherwell's 9th season in the Scottish Premier League, and their 22nd consecutive season in the top division of Scottish football. It was Maurice Malpas first, and only, season as manager of Motherwell having replaced Terry Butcher who had left to join Sydney FC at the end of the previous season, and himself sacked following the conclusion of the season.

Important Events

 29 July 2006 - The first Scottish Premier League game of the season ends in a 2–1 defeat against Rangers at Fir Park.
 22 August 2006 - The first Scottish League Cup game of the season ends in a 3–0 win against Queens Park at Hampden Park.
 22 August 2006 - Motherwell are eliminated from the Scottish League Cup after a 3–2 defeat against Kilmarnock at Rugby Park.
 7 January 2007 - The first Scottish Cup game of the season ends in a 1–0 win against Lanarkshire derby rivals Airdrie United at Excelsior Stadium.
 28 February 2007 - Motherwell are eliminated from the Scottish Cup after a 2–1 defeat against St Johnstone at Fir Park.
 12 May 2007 - Motherwell remain in the SPL despite a 3–2 defeat against St Mirren at Fir Park, as Inverness C.T. defeat Dunfermline Athletic to relegate the Pars.
 19 May 2007 - Final SPL game of the season ends in a 0–0 draw against Dundee United at Tannadice.

Squad
Updated 20 December 2010

Transfers

In

Out

Loans in

Released

Loans out

Competitions

Scottish Premier League

Classification

Results summary

Results by round

Results by opponent

Source: 2006–07 Scottish Premier League article

Results

Scottish Cup

Scottish League Cup

Statistics

Appearances
Updated 20 December 2010

 

|}

Top scorers

Last updated on 8 December 2010

Disciplinary record

Last updated 8 December 2010

See also
 List of Motherwell F.C. seasons

References

2006-07
Scottish football clubs 2006–07 season